Live in America is a second live album by Australian group, Little River Band. The album was released in April 1980 and peaked at No. 35 on the Australian Kent Music Report.

Track listing
Side A
"Hard Life" (Graham Goble) - 4:22
"The Rumor" (Glenn Shorrock) - 4:04 
"Mistress of Mine" (Goble) - 5:36
"Too Lonely Too Long" (Goble) - 3:04
"Red Shoes" (Beeb Birtles) - 4:29 
Side B
"I Don't Worry No More" (Birtles) - 4:10
"Let's Dance" (David Briggs) - 3:31 
"Man On the Run" (Birtles, Goble) - 3:57
"It's Not a Wonder" (Goble) - 4:24
"Sweet Old Fashioned Man" (Shorrock) - 4:29

Charts

References

Little River Band albums
1980 live albums
Capitol Records live albums